Scolecenchelys japonica is an eel in the family Ophichthidae (worm/snake eels). It was described by Yoshihiko Machida and Suguru Ohta in 1993, originally under the genus Muraenichthys. It is a marine, temperate water-dwelling eel which is known from Mishima Island, Japan, (from which its species epithet is derived) in the northwestern Pacific Ocean.

References

Taxa named by Yoshihiko Machida
Taxa named by Suguru Ohta
Fish described in 1993
japonica